Seseli annuum is a species of flowering plant belonging to the family Apiaceae.

Its native range is Europe.

References

Apioideae